Nicholas Agar (born 1965) is a New Zealand professor of ethics at the University of Waikato. Agar has a BA from the University of Auckland, an MA from the Victoria University of Wellington, and a PhD from the Australian National University. He has been teaching at Victoria since 1996.

Work on human enhancement 
Agar has written extensively on the debate about human enhancement and eugenics. His first significant contribution was the 2004 book Liberal Eugenics: In Defence of Human Enhancement. In the state-sponsored eugenics defended by the followers of Francis Galton individuals would defer to the state and its experts empowered to impose on all a centrally-determined conception of the good life. Agar argued that a vigorous defense of procreative freedom could turn the morally misguided authoritarian eugenics into a morally defensible liberal eugenics. Agar would encourage prospective parents to consult their own conceptions of the good life to choose some of their children's characteristics. A liberal state should ban choices judged injurious to children's well-being. It would exercise the same kinds of control over harmful genetic choices that it currently does over choices about how to raise children. 

Later work clarified Agar's philosophical focus on enhancement. The 2010 book Humanity's End argued against the doctrine of radical enhancement sometimes identified with the transhumanist movement. Agar claims that enhancement is a good thing that it is nevertheless possible to overdo. He advances a species-relativist view about the value of human experiences and achievements. Viewed from the perspective of our species-relativist preference a little enhancement goes a long way. Humanity's End was a 2011 Choice Magazine Outstanding Academic Title.

In his 2013 book Truly Human Enhancement Agar presented too much enhancement as an instance of transformative change. Agar defines transformative change as altering "the state of an individual's mental or physical characteristics in a way that causes and warrants a significant change in how that individual evaluates a wide range of their own experiences, beliefs, or achievements." He uses examples from the movie Invasion of the Body Snatchers to make the case that there are transformative changes that we correctly predict we will endorse once we have undergone them but that conflict with our prudential values. The central characters in the body snatchers movies resist snatching by the aliens even if they expect to be content about this change once they have undergone it. We may predict that we will enjoy life as a radically enhanced being but nevertheless be justified in rejecting it.

Work on technological change 
The 2015 book The Sceptical Optimist: Why Technology Isn't the Answer to Everything was a departure from Agar's focus on the debate about human enhancement. Agar challenges the techno-optimist view that expects great things from technological progress for human flourishing. He describes a phenomenon called hedonic normalization that leads us to significantly overestimate the power of technological progress to improve our well-being. We overlook hedonic normalization when we suppose that because we would be unhappy to find ourselves permanently transported back in time to the middle ages that people living back them must have been miserable too. The same distortions apply when we imagine a future with cures for cancer and colonies on Mars. Technological progress may make us happier but not nearly so much as we imagine it. This has implications for our collective prioritization of technological progress.  

In a 2019 book How to be Human in the Digital Economy Agar continues his defense of human values and experiences. Agar responds to the challenge from automation and artificial intelligence to human work and agency. Agar argues for a hybrid social-digital economy. The key value of the digital economy is efficiency. The key value of the social economy is humanness. A social economy would be centered on connections between human minds. We should reject some digital automation because machines will always be poor substitutes for humans in roles that involve direct contact with other humans. A machine can count out pills and pour out coffee, but we want our nurses and baristas to have minds like ours. In a hybrid social-digital economy, people do the jobs for which feelings matter and machines take on data-intensive work. But humans will have to insist on their relevance in a digital age.

Publications

Books
How to be Human in the Digital Economy (MIT Press, Cambridge, MA:, 2019)
The Sceptical Optimist: Why technology isn't the answer to everything (OUP, Oxford, 2015)
Truly Human Enhancement: A Philosophical Defense of Limits (MIT Press, Cambridge, MA:, 2013)
Humanity's End: Why We Should Reject Radical Enhancement (MIT Press, Cambridge, MA:, 2010)
Liberal Eugenics: In Defence of Human Enhancement (Oxford: Blackwell, 2004)
Perfect Copy (Cambridge: Icon, 2002)
Life's Intrinsic Value (New York: Columbia University Press, 2001)

Papers

See also
 Human enhancement
 Liberal eugenics

References

External links
 Nicholas Agar
 Agar's personal webpage
 Review of Agar, N: 2013, 'Truly Human Enhancement: A Philosophical Defense of Limits' Med Health Care and Philos

1965 births
Living people
Australian academics
Australian National University alumni
Australian philosophers
Bioethicists
Victoria University of Wellington alumni
Academic staff of the Victoria University of Wellington